Barch is a surname. Notable people with the surname include:

John Barch, American poker player
Krys Barch (born 1980), Canadian ice hockey player
Marie Barch (1744–1827), Danish ballerina
Otto Barch (born 1943), Kyrgyzstani racewalker

See also
 BArch (disambiguation)